Indre Tasta is a neighborhood (delområde) in the city of Stavanger which lies in the southwestern part of the large municipality of Stavanger in Rogaland county, Norway. It is located in the northern part of the mainland borough of Tasta. The Ytre Tasta neighborhood lies to the north, the Gandsfjorden lies to the east, the Stokkavatnet lake lies to the west, and the borough of Eiganes og Våland lies to the south. Tasta Church is located in this neighborhood.

References

Boroughs and neighbourhoods of Stavanger